MK Airlines Flight 1602 was an MK Airlines Boeing 747-200F cargo flight on a flight from Halifax Stanfield International Airport, Nova Scotia, Canada to Zaragoza Airport, Spain. It crashed on take-off in 2004, killing the crew of 7. It was the fourth accident for MK Airlines, as well as the deadliest.

Aircraft and crew
The Boeing 747-200 was originally manufactured for South African Airways in 1980 as ZS-SAR, making its first flight on 24 October of the same year, and being delivered on 6 November. At some point during its service with SAA, ZS-SAR was converted to a freighter. On 11 November 1992, ZS-SAR was leased to Garuda Indonesia as 3B-NAS. Sometime before September 1995, the aircraft was returned to SAA, and in March 2000, was sold to MK Airlines as 9G-MKJ.

The captain was Michael Thornycroft, who had been with MK Airlines since its establishment in 1990. He had 23,200 flight hours including 4,000 hours on the Boeing 747. Thornycroft also had dual South African and United Kingdom citizenship. The first officer was Gary Keogh, who had 8,537 flight hours. The flight engineer was Peter Launder, who had 2,000 flight hours. There was also a relief captain and flight engineer. The relief captain was David Lamb, and the relief flight engineer was Steven Hooper, who had 1,600 and 1,990 flight hours respectively. The ground engineer was Mario Zhan, who held dual South African and German citizenship, and the loadmaster was Chris Strydom. Five of the seven crew members were from Zimbabwe; the remaining two (Thornycroft and Zhan) were from South Africa.

Accident
At 00:03 local time, on 14 October 2004, MK Airlines Flight 1602 took off from Windsor-Locks-Bradley International Airport.

Flight 1602 taxied to Runway 24 (now assigned '23' designation), and the takeoff roll was commenced at 06:53:22. When the aircraft reached , the control column was moved aft to 8.4° to initiate rotation as the aircraft passed the  mark of Runway 24; with  left on the runway, the aircraft began to rotate. Because the 747 still had not lifted off the runway, the control column was moved further aft to 10°, and the aircraft responded with a further pitch up to approximately 11°; at this time, a tailstrike occurred. The aircraft was approximately at the  mark and slightly left of the center-line. The control column was then relaxed slightly, to 9° aft. The pitch attitude stabilized in the 11° range for the next four seconds, and the tailstrike abated as a result. With  remaining, a second tailstrike took place. The lower aft fuselage then struck an earthen berm supporting an instrument landing system (ILS) localizer antenna  beyond the end of the runway, separating from the plane. The plane then headed forwards in a straight line for another , breaking into pieces and bursting into flames when it struck the ground.

Emergency response

Over 60–80 firefighters and 20 pieces of apparatus from Halifax Regional Fire and Emergency responded to the call. It took nearly three hours to extinguish the post-crash fire.

Investigation

The official report blamed the company for serious non-conformances to flight and duty time, with no regulations or company rules governing maximum duty periods for loadmasters and ground engineers, resulting in increased potential for fatigue-induced errors.

MK Airlines disputed the findings, citing the fact that the cockpit voice recorder (CVR) was too heavily damaged in the post-crash fire to yield any information.

See also
 Boeing 747 hull losses
 National Airlines Flight 102

References

External links

 MK Airlines Flight 1602 final accident report
 MK Airlines Flight 1602 final accident report 

Airliner accidents and incidents in Canada
Aviation accidents and incidents in 2004
Accidents and incidents involving the Boeing 747
Disasters in Nova Scotia
History of Halifax, Nova Scotia
2004 disasters in Canada
2004 in Nova Scotia
October 2004 events in Canada
Halifax Stanfield International Airport
Airliner accidents and incidents caused by pilot error
2004 in Canada